Eubranchipus is a genus of brine shrimp and fairy shrimp in the family Chirocephalidae. There are about 16 described species in Eubranchipus.

Species
 Eubranchipus asanumai
 Eubranchipus birostratus (Fischer, 1851)
 Eubranchipus bundyi Forbes, 1876
 Eubranchipus claviger (Fischer, 1851)
 Eubranchipus grubii (Dybowski, 1860)
 Eubranchipus hankoi (Dudich, 1927)
 Eubranchipus hatanakai
 Eubranchipus holmanii (Ryder, 1879)
 Eubranchipus intricatus Hartland-Rowe, 1967
 Eubranchipus khankanus
 Eubranchipus moorei Brtek, 1967
 Eubranchipus neglectus Garman, 1926
 Eubranchipus oregonus Creaser, 1930
 Eubranchipus ornatus Holmes, 1910
 Eubranchipus rostratus (Daday, 1910)
 Eubranchipus serratus Forbes, 1876 (ethologist fairy shrimp)
 Eubranchipus uchidai (Kikuchi, 1957)
 Eubranchipus vernalis (Verrill, 1869) (eastern fairy shrimp)
 Eubranchipus vladimiri Vekhov & Vekhov, 1992

References

Anostraca